There were four elections to the United States House of Representatives in 1959, all during the 86th United States Congress.  Three of them were special elections to fill vacancies, and the fourth was to fill a seat for the new state of Hawaii.  There were no special elections to the 85th Congress in 1959.

Special elections 

Elections are listed by date and district.

|-
| 
| George H. Christopher
|  | Democratic
| 1948
|  | Incumbent died January 23, 1959.New member elected March 3, 1959.Democratic hold.
| nowrap | 

|-
| 
| Daniel A. Reed
|  | Republican
| 1918
|  | Incumbent died February 19, 1959New member elected May 26, 1959. Republican hold.
| nowrap | 

|-
| 
| Steven V. Carter
|  | Democratic
| 1958
|  | Incumbent died November 4, 1959New member elected December 15, 1959.Republican gain.
| nowrap | 

|}

Hawaii 

In 1959, Hawaii became a state and elected one new member of the House, Democrat Daniel Inouye.

|-
| 
| colspan=3 | New state
|  | New seat.New member elected August 21, 1959.Democratic gain.
| nowrap | 

|}

References 

 
1959